The Grammy Award for Best Pop Collaboration with Vocals was an honor presented at the Grammy Awards, a ceremony that was established in 1958 and originally called the Gramophone Awards, to recording artists for quality pop songs on which singers collaborate. Awards in several categories are distributed annually  by the National Academy of Recording Arts and Sciences of the United States to "honor artistic achievement, technical proficiency  and overall excellence in the recording industry, without regard to album sales or chart position."

The award for Best Pop Collaboration with Vocals was first presented to Al Green and Lyle Lovett at the 37th Grammy Awards (1995) for the song "Funny How Time Slips Away". According to the category description guide for the 52nd Grammy Awards, the award was presented to artists that performed "newly recorded collaborative pop performances" that "do not normally perform together."

In 1997, the father-daughter duo of Nat King Cole and Natalie Cole won the award for "When I Fall in Love", a "virtual duet" remake of one of his signature hits, using a recording of his vocals more than 30 years after his death in 1965.

There have been five instances in which an artist was nominated for more than one song in the same year, with different collaborators. In 1998, Barbra Streisand received nominations for the songs "I Finally Found Someone" (with Bryan Adams) and "Tell Him" (with Celine Dion). Santana was nominated in 2000 for the songs "Love of My Life" (with Dave Matthews) and "Smooth" (with Rob Thomas). In 2002, Christina Aguilera was nominated for the songs "Nobody Wants to Be Lonely" (Ricky Martin) and "Lady Marmalade" (with Lil' Kim, Mýa and Pink). In 2005, Ray Charles earned nominations for the songs "Sorry Seems to Be the Hardest Word" (with Elton John) and "Here We Go Again" (with Norah Jones). In 2010, Colbie Caillat was nominated for the songs "Breathe" (with Taylor Swift) and "Lucky" (with Jason Mraz). Four of the five won the award with one of their two nominations (Santana's "Smooth"; Aguilera's "Lady Marmalade"; Charles's "Here We Go Again"; and Caillat's "Lucky").

Two-time award recipients include Van Morrison, Pink, Santana, Alison Krauss, and Robert Plant. Krauss and Plant are the only duo to win more than once, as well as the only consecutive winners. Christina Aguilera and Stevie Wonder share the record for the most nominations, with six each.

The award was discontinued in 2012 in a major overhaul of Grammy categories. At that point, all duo or group performances in the pop category were shifted to the newly formed Best Pop Duo/Group Performance category. The 2011 award for a cover version of "Imagine" was the last one to be awarded in the Best Pop Collaboration with Vocals category.

Recipients

 Each year is linked to the article about the Grammy Awards held that year.

See also
 Grammy Award for Best Pop Vocal Album
 List of Grammy Award categories

References
Specific

General
  Note: User must select the "Pop" category as the genre under the search feature.

External links
Official site of the Grammy Awards

 
1995 establishments in the United States
2011 disestablishments in the United States
Awards disestablished in 2011
Awards established in 1995
Pop Collaboration With Vocals
Musical collaboration awards